Powerpet railway station (station code: PRH), is an Indian Railways station in Eluru city of Andhra Pradesh. It lies on the Vijayawada–Nidadavolu loop line of Howrah–Chennai main line and is administered under Vijayawada railway division of South Central Railway zone.

History 
The southern part of the East Coast State Railway (from Waltair to Vijayawada) was taken over by Madras Railway in 1901.

Electrification 
The Mustabad–Gannavaram–Nuzvid–Bhimadolu sector was electrified in 1995–96.

Classification 
In terms of earnings and outward passengers handled, Powerpet is categorized as a Non-Suburban Grade-5 (NSG-5) railway station. Based on the re–categorization of Indian Railway stations for the period of 2017–18 and 2022–23, an NSG–5 category station earns between – crore and handles  passengers.

Station amenities 

It is one of the 38 stations in the division to be equipped with Automatic Ticket Vending Machines (ATVMs).

References

External links 
South Central Railway

Railway stations in West Godavari district
Vijayawada railway division
Railway stations in Eluru
Railway stations in India opened in 1896
1893 establishments in India